Faridkot (station code: FDK) is a railway station located in Faridkot district in the Indian state of Punjab and serves Faridkot city. Faridkot station falls under Firozpur railway division of Northern Railway zone of Indian Railways.

The railway station 
The station is located on the single track,  broad gauge Bhatinda–Firozpur railway line. It is well connected to a number of major cities.

Electrification 
The electrification of the single track, 87 km Bhatinda–Firozpur railway sector was sanctioned at a cost of Rs 223.93 crore in September, 2018. The completion of electrification is expected by March 2022

Amenities 
Faridkot railway station has computerized reservation counters, and all basic amenities.

References

External links 

 Pictures of Faridkot station

Railway stations in Faridkot district
Firozpur railway division